Basina or Basine (c. 438 – 477) was remembered as a queen of Thuringia in the middle of the fifth century, by much later authors such as especially Gregory of Tours. However, because Gregory described her family's kingdom of Thuringia as being on the Gaulish or western side of the river Rhine, it is sometimes thought to be the Civitas Tungrorum, which is now Belgium.

Biography 
Gregory of Tours reported that Childeric I was exiled from Roman Gaul for a period, and during that time he went to the kingdom of Thuringia. When he returned, Basina came with him, although she had been married to the king there, Bisinus. She herself took the initiative to ask for the hand of Childeric I, king of the Franks, and married him. For as she herself said, "I want to have the most powerful man in the world, even if I have to cross the ocean for him". 

Childeric and Basina were the parents of Clovis I, who is remembered as the first medieval king to rule Gaul, and all the Frankish kingdoms.

According to the Gesta episcoporum Cameracensium, the Frankish King Ragnachar, and his brother Richar, from the area of Cambrai were related to Basina.

Marriage and children

In 463, Basina married Childeric I, son of Merovech and his wife, and had the following children:
Clovis I (466 – 511)
Audofleda (467 – 511) – queen of the Ostrogoths and wife of Theodoric the Great
Lantechildis (468 – ?)
Albofledis (470 – ?).

Portrayals
Queen Basina of Thuringia is the central antagonist in the 2005 film, The Brothers Grimm.

See also
Gregory of Tours

Sources

External links
Project Continua: Biography of Basine 
430s births
477 deaths
Consorts of Thuringia
Remarried royal consorts
Frankish queens consort
Year of birth unknown
5th-century women